OpenMusic is an object-oriented visual programming environment.

OpenMusic or Open music may also refer to:
 Open (music), a wider spacing of notes in a chord (as compared to close position)
 Open Music, a former state-owned record label and music publishing house in Bratislava, Czechoslovakia
 Open music, music that is available in "source code" form and allows derivative works

See also
 Free music, music that can freely be copied, distributed and modified for any purpose
 Open Music Model, an economic framework proposing aper month all-you-can-download subscription fee
 Open Music System, a virtual studio management application for the Classic Mac OS